The 1840 Vermont gubernatorial election was held on September 1, 1840. Incumbent Whig Governor Silas H. Jennison defeated Democratic nominee Paul Dillingham with 59.58% of the vote.

General election

Candidates
Paul Dillingham, Democratic, town clerk of Waterbury, former member of the Vermont House of Representatives
Silas H. Jennison, Whig, incumbent Governor

Results

Notes

References

1840
Vermont
Gubernatorial